The 1999 Australian Individual Speedway Championship was held at the Olympic Park Speedway in Mildura, Victoria on 13 February 1999.

Former World #3 Todd Wiltshire won his first Australian Championship defeating Jason Lyons in a runoff after both finished on 14 points. Adelaide's Nigel Sadler finished third after defeating Perth's Frank Smart and local youngster Travis McGowan in a runoff after all three riders finished on 10 points.

Despite the championship being run on his home track, defending champion Leigh Adams did not ride in the Australian Final for the first time since 1991 where he had been forced to withdraw after breaking his wrist in a crash in Adelaide three weeks before the event.

1999 Australian Solo Championship
 13 February 1999
  Mildura - Olympic Park Speedway
 Referee: 
 Qualification: The top four riders go through to the Overseas Final in King's Lynn, England.

References

See also
 Australia national speedway team
 Sport in Australia

Speedway in Australia
Australia
Individual Speedway Championship